Ikerasaarsuk Heliport  is a heliport in Ikerasaarsuk, a village in Avannaata municipality in western Greenland. The heliport is considered a helistop, and is served by Air Greenland as part of a government contract.

Airlines and destinations 

Air Greenland operates government contract flights to villages in the Aasiaat Archipelago. These mostly cargo flights are not featured in the timetable, although they can be pre-booked. Departure times for these flights as specified during booking are by definition approximate, with the settlement service optimized on the fly depending on local demand for a given day.

Settlement flights in the Disko Bay and Aasiaat archipelago areas are unique in that they are operated only during winter and spring. During summer and autumn, communication between settlements is by sea only, serviced by Diskoline.

References

Airports in the Arctic
Heliports in Greenland